
Gmina Tarłów is a rural gmina (administrative district) in Opatów County, Świętokrzyskie Voivodeship, in south-central Poland.

Villages
Gmina Tarłów contains the villages and settlements of Bronisławów, Brzozowa, Cegielnia, Ciszyca Dolna, Ciszyca Górna, Ciszyca Przewozowa, Ciszyca-Kolonia, Czekarzewice Drugie, Czekarzewice Pierwsze, Dąbrówka, Dorotka, Duranów, Hermanów, Jadwigów, Janów, Julianów, Kolonia Dąbrówka, Kozłówek, Leopoldów, Leśne Chałupy, Łubowa, Maksymów, Mieczysławów, Ostrów, Potoczek, Słupia Nadbrzeżna, Słupia Nadbrzeżna-Kolonia, Sulejów, Tadeuszów, Tarłów, Teofilów, Tomaszów, Wesołówka, Wólka Lipowa, Wólka Tarłowska and Zemborzyn Kościelny.

Neighbouring gminas
Gmina Tarłów is bordered by the gminas of Annopol, Bałtów, Ćmielów, Józefów nad Wisłą, Lipsko, Ożarów, Sienno and Solec nad Wisłą.

References
Polish official population figures 2006

Tarlow
Opatów County